Myrsine brownii is a species of plant in the family Primulaceae. It is endemic to French Polynesia.

References

brownii
Critically endangered plants
Flora of the Tubuai Islands
Taxonomy articles created by Polbot